Damián Szifron (born 9 July 1975) is an Argentine film and television director and screenwriter, best known as the creator of the TV series Los Simuladores (2002), the most successful TV series in the history of Argentina, and writer-director of Wild Tales (2014), the most successful film in the history of Argentina. On 18 March 2022, Paramount announced a film based on Los Simuladores, directed by Szifron, programmed for 2024.

Biography
Born to a Jewish family, Szifron studied cinema with the film theory writer Angel Faretta. Szifron was the writer and director of Hermanos y Detectives ("Brothers and Detectives"), the follow-up series to the hugely popular Los Simuladores ("The Pretenders"). His 2014 film Wild Tales was selected to compete for the Palme d'Or in the main competition section at the 2014 Cannes Film Festival, nominated for the Best Foreign Language Film at the 87th Academy Awards and winner of both the BAFTA and Goya awards for Best Foreign Language Film.

Filmography
 El tren (1992) (Short film)
 Río de culpas (1993) (Short film)
 Oídos sordos (1995) (Short film)
 Kan, el trueno (1997) (Short film)
 Punto muerto (1998) (Short film)
 Los últimos días (1999) (Short film)
 El fondo del mar (2003)
 Tiempo de valientes (2005)
 Relatos salvajes (2014)
 To Catch a Killer (2023)
 Los Simuladores (TBA)

Television
 Los simuladores (2002 - 2003) TV Series
 Hermanos & detectives (2006) TV Series

References

External links
 
 

1975 births
Argentine people of German-Jewish descent
Argentine television directors
Argentine film directors
Argentine screenwriters
Male screenwriters
Argentine male writers
Argentine Jews
Jewish Argentine writers
Living people
People from Ramos Mejía
Filmmakers who won the Best Foreign Language Film BAFTA Award